In geometry, a frustum, (from the Latin for 'morsel'; plural: frusta or frustums), is the portion of a solid (normally a pyramid or a cone) that lies between two parallel planes cutting this solid. In the case of a pyramid, the base faces are polygonal, the side faces are trapezoidal. A right frustum is a right pyramid or a right cone truncated perpendicularly to its axis; otherwise it is an oblique frustum.

If all its edges are forced to become of the same length, then a frustum becomes a prism (possibly oblique or/and with irregular bases).

In computer graphics, the viewing frustum is the three-dimensional region which is visible on the screen. It is formed by a clipped pyramid; in particular, frustum culling is a method of hidden surface determination.

In the aerospace industry, a frustum is the fairing between two stages of a multistage rocket (such as the Saturn V), which is shaped like a truncated cone.

Elements, special cases, and related concepts

A frustum's axis is that of the original cone or pyramid. A frustum is circular if it has circular bases; it is right if the axis is perpendicular to both bases, and oblique otherwise.

The height of a frustum is the perpendicular distance between the planes of the two bases.

Cones and pyramids can be viewed as degenerate cases of frusta, where one of the cutting planes passes through the apex (so that the corresponding base reduces to a point). The pyramidal frusta are a subclass of prismatoids.

Two frusta with two congruent bases joined at these congruent bases make a bifrustum.

Formulas

Volume
The formula for the volume of a pyramidal square frustum was introduced by the ancient Egyptian mathematics in what is called the Moscow Mathematical Papyrus, written in the 13th dynasty:

The Egyptians knew the correct formula for the volume of such a truncated square pyramid, but no proof of this equation is given in the Moscow papyrus.

The volume of a conical or pyramidal frustum is the volume of the solid before slicing its "apex" off, minus the volume of this "apex":

Considering that

the formula for the volume can be expressed as the third of the product of this proportionality, and of the difference of the cubes of the heights  and  only:

By using the identity , one gets:

where  is the height of the frustum.

the alternative formula is therefore:

Heron of Alexandria is noted for deriving this formula, and with it, encountering the imaginary unit: the square root of negative one.

In particular:
The volume of a circular cone frustum is:

The volume of a pyramidal frustum whose bases are regular -gons is:

Surface area

For a right circular conical frustum

and

where r1 and r2 are the base and top radii respectively, and s is the slant height of the frustum.

The surface area of a right frustum whose bases are similar regular n-sided polygons is

where a1 and a2 are the sides of the two bases.

Examples 

On the back (the reverse) of a United States one-dollar bill, a pyramidal frustum appears on the reverse of the Great Seal of the United States, surmounted by the Eye of Providence.
Ziggurats, step pyramids, and certain ancient Native American mounds also form the frustum of one or more pyramids, with additional features such as stairs added.
Chinese pyramids.
The John Hancock Center in Chicago, Illinois is a frustum whose bases are rectangles.
The Washington Monument is a narrow square-based pyramidal frustum topped by a small pyramid.
The viewing frustum in 3D computer graphics is a virtual photographic or video camera's usable field of view modeled as a pyramidal frustum.
In the English translation of Stanislaw Lem's short-story collection The Cyberiad, the poem Love and tensor algebra claims that "every frustum longs to be a cone".
Buckets and typical lampshades are everyday examples of conical frustums.
Drinking glasses and some space capsules are also some examples.
Garsų Gaudyklė wooden structure or statue in Lithuania.
Valençay cheese
Rolo candies

See also
Spherical frustum

Notes

References

External links

Derivation of formula for the volume of frustums of pyramid and cone (Mathalino.com)

Paper models of frustums (truncated pyramids)
Paper model of frustum (truncated cone)
Design paper models of conical frustum (truncated cones)

Polyhedra
Prismatoid polyhedra